The following article presents a summary of the 1924 football (soccer) season in Brazil, which was the 23rd season of competitive football in the country.

Campeonato Paulista

Final Stage

Corinthians declared as the Campeonato Paulista champions.

State championship champions

Other competition champions

Brazil national team
The Brazil national football team did not play any matches in 1924.

References

 Brazilian competitions at RSSSF
 1923-1932 Brazil national team matches at RSSSF

 
Seasons in Brazilian football
Brazil